A.T.F. is a 1999 American television film directed by Dean Parisot and written by Patricia Cornwell and Michelle Ashford, based on a story by Cornwell. The film stars Kathy Baker and Amy Brenneman as ATF agents who work to infiltrate an armed militia, a group which the film describes as akin to the Branch Davidians, a religious group held off ATF agents and were later set siege to by the FBI in Waco, Texas in the Waco Siege of 1993.

A.T.F. was produced by Columbia TriStar Television as a television pilot for ABC, on which it aired on September 6, 1999.

Plot
Following the infamous tragedy in Waco, Texas, in which the Bureau of Alcohol, Tobacco and Firearms (A.T.F.) found themselves in a battle with an armed militia, the organization, led by director Maggie Hale (Kathy Baker), finds itself in a new fight. Agent Robyn O'Brien (Amy Brenneman) goes undercover to infiltrate a militia selling illegal street-sweeper guns, dismissing Hale's orders to stay away. When O'Brien gets held prisoner inside the militia's compound, the A.T.F. is left with the decision to start another Waco and attack the militia, or come up with another way to save her.

Cast
 Kathy Baker as A.T.F. Director Maggie Hale
 Amy Brenneman as Agent Robin O'Brien
 Vincent Angell as Agent Reeve Aquilar
 Michael O'Neill as Asst. A.T.F. Director Ben Walker
 Keith David as F.B.I Director Richard Long
 Mark Boone Junior as Jake Neill
 William Richert as Patrick McKennan
 Sarah Trigger as Carol
 John Philbin as Randy
 Raphael Sbarge as Director Hale's Assistant
 John Beasley as Secretary Robert Edwards
 Coby Bell as Agent Dinko Bates
 Sean Bridgers as Smitty

See also
 Waco Siege
 List of television films produced for American Broadcasting Company

References

External links 
 

1999 television films
1999 films
1990s American films
1990s English-language films
ABC network original films
Bureau of Alcohol, Tobacco, Firearms and Explosives in fiction
Films directed by Dean Parisot
Television films as pilots
Television pilots not picked up as a series